St. Stephen's Episcopal Church is a historic church in Innis, Louisiana, United States.  The church was built in 1848 and was consecrated by Bishop Leonidas Polk.  It is the oldest brick edifice in Pointe Coupee Parish. Past communicants include Major General John Archer Lejeune and Dr. Tichenor.  It is also home to a cemetery with a monument to a Confederate Unknown Soldier, erected in 1901.  This church was listed on the National Register of Historic Places on April 24, 1974.

St. Stephen's Episcopal Church is an active parish in the Episcopal Diocese of Louisiana. The Rev. John Miller now serves as Priest-in-Charge.

References

American Civil War sites
Confederate States of America monuments and memorials in Louisiana
Episcopal church buildings in Louisiana
Monuments and memorials in Louisiana
Churches in Pointe Coupee Parish, Louisiana
Churches completed in 1848
19th-century Episcopal church buildings
Churches on the National Register of Historic Places in Louisiana
National Register of Historic Places in Pointe Coupee Parish, Louisiana